The Turkish History Thesis (Türk Tarih Tezi) is a Turkish ultranationalist, pseudohistoric thesis which posited the belief that the Turks moved from their ancestral homeland in Central Asia and migrated to China, India, the Balkans, the Middle East, and northern Africa in several waves, populating the areas which they had moved to and bringing civilization to their native inhabitants. The theory was developed within the context of pre-Nazi scientific racism, classifying the Turks as an "Alpine subgroup" of the Caucasian race. The intent of the theory was a rejection of Western European assertions that the Turks belonged to the "yellow or mongol" race. Mustafa Kemal Atatürk took a personal interest in the subject after he was shown a French language book that claimed Turks "belonged to the yellow race" and were a "secondaire" people.

In the aftermath of World War I, the Turks strove to prove that they were the equals of the Western nations, an attempt which had historical and racial connotations. The Turkish History Thesis created a third alternative to the existing narratives which claimed that Greece or Mesopotamia, or both, were the "cradles" of Western civilization. The thesis itself rested on a spurious intellectual foundation by claiming that the Turks had a Hittite ancestry which was of Central Asian Aryan origin. The thesis insisted that all Turkic peoples had a common racial origin and it also insisted that they had created a great civilization in their Central Asian homeland in prehistoric times and have preserved their language and racial characteristics ever since. According to the thesis, the Turks had originally migrated from Central Asia to China and from China, they migrated to India, where they founded the civilizations of Mohenjo-daro and Harappa, and from India, they migrated to other parts of the world.

The Thesis was made known to the public during the First Turkish Historical Congress, which was held between 2 and 11 July 1932. The congress was attended by eighteen professors of the University of Istanbul (then known as Darülfünün), of which some would be dismissed after the congress. 196 Turkish high school teachers were also mentioned in the protocol of the congress. The opening speech belonged to Mahmut Esat Bozkurt, during which he criticized the western scholars for their interpretation of the Turkish history. He claimed that the Central Asian Turks have departed the Stone Age 7000 years before the Europeans and then dispersed westwards as the first people to have brought civilization to the humans. Afet İnan, an adoptive daughter of Mustafa Kemal Atatürk and member of the Turkish history committee of the Turkish Hearths, pushed the view that the Turks were what was racially called "brachycephalic" and they have established a developed civilization around an "inner sea" which is located in Central Asia. According to her, they left after the "inner sea" dried up due to climate change and from there, they spread out and disseminated civilization to other cultures, including the cultures which existed in China, India, Egypt and Greece. The internal contradictions of the Turkish History Thesis became more pronounced in later decades as Colonel Kurtcebe sought to raise the modern Turkish people's awareness of its connection to Central Asia and the Mongols. He believed that an emphasis on Western-style historical education had caused the Turks to be uninterested in Mongolian history. This emphasis on Western-style historical education produced a confused doctrine which forced military publications to maintain the Turkish History Thesis's connection to European races, but at the same time, it promoted an image in which the Turkish military was superior to the military forces of all Western powers due to its roots in a Central Asian past.

The thesis was influenced by the book Türk Tarihinin Ana Hatları (The Mainlines of Turkish History) published by the Committee for the Study of the Turkish History (TOTTTH) of the Turkish Hearths and became a "state dogma" which was included in school textbooks. During Atatürk's government, scholars like Hasan Reşit Tankut and Rıfat Osman Bey were encouraged that the findings of their studies in history and social sciences be in line with the Turkish Historical Thesis and the Sun Language Theory. The Turkish Historical Thesis is connected with the Sun Language Theory published in 1935 which stipulates that all languages have their origin from the Turkish language. Prominent scholars like Zeki Velidi Togan and Nihal Atsız who challenged the Turkish Historical Thesis lost their jobs at the University.

Turkish History Thesis and Hittites 
Kemalism gave an important place to Hittites and the Hittite symbolism to construct the Turkish identity and nationhood. Kemalist researchers, such as Ahmet Ağaoğlu (who was an advisor to Atatürk and a politician who played an important role on creating Turkey's constitution of 1924), believed in that the nation has to portray Hittites as a world-domineering Turkish race with firm roots in Anatolia.

Modern genetic researches on Turkish samples show that Anatolian Turks are a mixture of Turkic tribes and Anatolian natives, however, unlike Turkish History Thesis, these two admixtures do not originate from the same ethnicity, race or identity.

References 

History of the Republic of Turkey
Pseudohistory
Far-right politics in Turkey
Turkish nationalism